The Gilles are the oldest and principal participants in the Carnival of Binche in Belgium. They go out on Shrove Tuesday from 4 am until late hours and dance to traditional songs.  Other cities, such as La Louvière and Nivelles, have a tradition of Gilles at carnival, but the Carnival of Binche is by far the most famous. In 2003, the Carnival of Binche was proclaimed one of the Masterpieces of the Oral and Intangible Heritage of Humanity by UNESCO.

Costume
Around 1000 Gilles, all male, some as young as three years old, wear the traditional costume of the Gille on Shrove Tuesday.  The outfit features a linen suit with red, yellow, and black heraldic designs (the colours of the Belgian flag), trimmed with large white-lace cuffs and collars. The suit is stuffed with straw, giving the Gille a hunched back.

Gilles also wear wooden clogs and have bells attached to their belts. In the morning, they wear a wax mask of a particular design. After reaching the town hall, they remove these masks for the afternoon. During the afternoon parade, Gilles throw blood oranges to the crowd or at its members, and some wear large, white, feathered hats. Gilles carry ramons, tied bunches of twigs that are said to ward off evil spirits, and baskets in which to carry the oranges.

References

Notes

Bibliography

External links
  Official site of Binche
  Official site of Nivelles
  International Carnival & Mask Museum in Binche
  Traditional tambourines

Carnivals
Belgian folklore
Carnivals in Belgium
Walloon culture
Binche
La Louvière
Spring (season) events in Belgium